Acrolophus fervidus is a moth of the family Acrolophidae described by August Busck in 1912. It is found in Costa Rica, Mexico and Texas.

References

Moths described in 1912
fervidus